Poluli (also Romanized as Polūlī, Polooli, Pelowlī, and Pelūlī; also known as Fūlvārī and Phulwāri) is a village in Chahar Cheshmeh Rural District, Kamareh District, Khomeyn County, Markazi Province, Iran. At the 2006 census, its population was 30, in 8 families.

References 

Populated places in Khomeyn County